Hamirpur Lok Sabha constituency may refer to:
 Hamirpur, Himachal Pradesh Lok Sabha constituency
 Hamirpur, Uttar Pradesh Lok Sabha constituency